In statistics, the Anscombe transform, named after Francis Anscombe, is a variance-stabilizing transformation that transforms a random variable with a Poisson distribution into one with an approximately standard Gaussian distribution. The Anscombe transform is widely used in photon-limited imaging (astronomy, X-ray) where images naturally follow the Poisson law. The Anscombe transform is usually used to pre-process the data in order to make the standard deviation approximately constant.  Then denoising algorithms designed for the framework of additive white Gaussian noise are used; the final estimate is then obtained by applying an inverse Anscombe transformation to the denoised data.

Definition
For the Poisson distribution the mean  and variance  are not independent: . The Anscombe transform

 

aims at transforming the data so that the variance is set approximately 1 for large enough mean; for mean zero, the variance is still zero.

It transforms Poissonian data  (with mean ) to approximately Gaussian data of mean  
and standard deviation . 
This approximation gets more accurate for larger , as can be also seen in the figure.

Inversion
When the Anscombe transform is used in denoising (i.e. when the goal is to obtain from  an estimate of ), its inverse transform is also needed
in order to return the variance-stabilized and denoised data  to the original range.
Applying the algebraic inverse

 

usually introduces undesired bias to the estimate of the mean , because the forward square-root
transform is not linear. Sometimes using the asymptotically unbiased inverse

 

mitigates the issue of bias, but this is not the case in photon-limited imaging, for which
the exact unbiased inverse given by the implicit mapping

 

should be used. A closed-form approximation of this exact unbiased inverse is

Alternatives
There are many other possible variance-stabilizing transformations for the Poisson distribution. Bar-Lev and Enis report a family of such transformations which includes the Anscombe transform. Another member of the family is the Freeman-Tukey transformation

 

A simplified transformation, obtained as the primitive of the reciprocal of the standard deviation of the data, is

 

which, while it is not quite so good at stabilizing the variance, has the advantage of being more easily understood.
Indeed, from the delta method,

.

Generalization
While the Anscombe transform is appropriate for pure Poisson data, in many applications the data presents also an additive Gaussian component. These cases are treated by a Generalized Anscombe transform and its asymptotically unbiased or exact unbiased inverses.

See also
Variance-stabilizing transformation
Box–Cox transformation

References

Further reading

Poisson distribution
Normal distribution
Statistical data transformation